Oele (in old Dutch also: Eule, Dutch Low Saxon: Eul) is a village in the municipality Hengelo in the Dutch province of Overijssel. It is located south-west of Hengelo, south of the Twentekanaal. The highway A35 and the Provincial road 739|N739 (the road from Hengelo to Beckum and Haaksbergen) are close to the population centre. Until the creation of the municipality of Hengelo, Oele was part of the richterambt Delden.

Water Mill De Oldemeule

Since the 14th century, Oele has a water mill. The current water mill, De Oldemeule, dates back to 1690. The water mill was owned by Joost Christoffer van Beverforde tot Oldemeule, drost of Twente and owner of the havezate (a type of fortified house) Oldemeule, that was demolished in 1800. The estate that belonged to havezate was handed over to Twickel in 1840, the mill was added to this property in 1880. In the past there was also an oil mill, but this was demolished in 1900. During the Second World War the mill was still in use to process grain, but after the war, the mill was in decline. Now the mill is owned by the municipality of Hengelo, which reinstated the mill in 1979. The mill is opened to the public on Sundays during the summer months. During the last couple of years, new millers have been trained to operate the mill.

Piet Mondriaan
Piet Mondriaan stayed in Oele a number of times in 1907 with his friend and painter Albert G. Hulshoff Pol (1883-1957). During this period he made famous Works as "Het bos bij Oele" (the forest near Oele) and "De rode wolk" (the red cloud).

Gallery

References

Populated places in Overijssel
Hengelo